The Bigelow House, also known as the Bigelow House Museum, is a historic house museum located at 918 Glass Avenue Northeast in the Bigelow Neighborhood of Olympia, Washington. Built by Daniel Bigelow in the 1850s, the house was designed in the Carpenter Gothic style. It was listed on the National Register of Historic Places in 1979.

History
Harvard Law School graduate Daniel Bigelow arrived in Olympia in 1851 after crossing the Oregon Trail.  He took up a  Donation Land Claim just east of the new town and built a two-room cabin near an artesian spring overlooking Budd Inlet in South Puget Sound.  In 1854 Bigelow married Ann Elizabeth White, one of the first school teachers in the territory.  They built the present house by 1860 where they raised eight children.

The Bigelows were active in many political causes including temperance, women's suffrage and public education.  Over the years many historical figures visited the Bigelows including Snoqualmie headman Patkanim, Suffragette Susan B. Anthony and George Pickett when he was stationed in the territory prior to the American Civil War. The Bigelows were also a host family for some of the Mercer Girls when they arrived in 1866.  The Bigelows lived in the house until their deaths; Daniel in 1905 and Ann Elizabeth in 1926.

The house remained in the Bigelow family until 1994 when owners Daniel S Bigelow (grandson of Daniel and Ann Elizabeth) and Mary Ann Campbell Bigelow helped form the non-profit Bigelow House Preservation Association (BHPA) to save the house from developers.  BHPA restored the house to its territorial era appearance, naming it the Bigelow House Museum in 1995.  The Bigelow family also retained a life-estate agreement that allowed them to remain in the house for the rest of their lives.
 
Since 2005 the Bigelow House Museum is fully open as a public museum, displaying original territorial era furnishings, photos, and documents.  It is one of the oldest and most intact pioneer-era homes in Washington.  The home is also the centerpiece of the Bigelow Neighborhood, which includes many homes built by the Bigelow and White families.  In 2013 BHPA merged with the Olympia Historical Society becoming the Olympia Historical Society and Bigelow House Museum.

See also
 Hale House 
 History of Olympia, Washington
 History of Washington State
 List of museums in Washington

References

External links

Olympia Historical Society and Bigelow House Museum (official website)
HABS Data @Library of Congress American Memory
Bigelow Springs Park

National Register of Historic Places in Olympia, Washington
Houses in Thurston County, Washington
Historic house museums in Washington (state)
Museums in Thurston County, Washington
Carpenter Gothic architecture in Washington (state)
Carpenter Gothic houses in the United States
Bigelow
Tourist attractions in Olympia, Washington